Seddon is an inner-city suburb in Melbourne, Victoria, Australia,  west of Melbourne's Central Business District, located within the City of Maribyrnong local government area.

Located south of Footscray and north of Yarraville, Seddon was formerly a semi-industrial, working-class suburb. In recent years Seddon has experienced rapid gentrification due to its close proximity to the Melbourne City Centre.

History

Originally known as Belgravia, Seddon was officially declared a suburb in 1906, named after Richard Seddon, the New Zealand Prime Minister from 1893 to 1906, who resided there before he moved to Bendigo and later to New Zealand.

Seddon was, on occasion, considered part of neighbouring Footscray. The original State Bank of Victoria in Charles Street, Seddon used to stamp its Bank Account passbooks as Footscray South Vic. Not unusual, considering Seddon is south of Footscray. However, while central Footscray is one of the main shopping and transport hubs for Melbourne's western suburbs, Seddon, in contrast, is quiet, leafy and residential.

The Main streets of Victoria, Charles and Gamon used to accommodate a tram line that ran through the middle of the Seddon Village. It has since been replaced with central garden beds and tree plantings in the middle of the streets.

Seddon street names were named for monarchs. Reading from west to east, Charles intersects with Alfred, Edward, Henry, James, William, Victoria (which runs parallel to Windsor) and terminates at Albert. 
 
Seddon Post Office opened on 29 September 1908 and closed in 1976. Seddon West Post Office opened in 1924 and has since been renamed to the Seddon Post Office after its relocation further south on Victoria Street. Seddon shares its postcode with neighbouring Footscray – 3011.

Community Organizations and Businesses

The Seddon Community Group with the assistance of the Maribyrnong Council puts on the Seddon Festival each year, closing all the main streets in the village to vehicles for exclusive pedestrian access. Several large band stages are erected on streets throughout the village and traders extend their seating onto the streets for the day. The Seddon Festival plays host to the Seddon Waiters Race, an event in which all of the local cafes and restaurants enter a waiter to compete carrying drinks and food through a short course on the street. The Snapshots of Seddon photography competition is also usually awarded judges prizes at the festival after entrants have had their photos displayed in the windows of the local business for the preceding month for judging of the peoples choice award.

The Seddon Makers Market (formerly Maribyrnong Makers Market) operates throughout the year on the grounds of the Seddon Uniting Church on Gamon Street. Established in 2008, the market is a not-for-profit, community based designer market run by a local volunteer group. The group provides a forum for artists and crafts people to promote and sell handmade wares.

Local businesses that have incorporated the suburb name into their own are: Seddon Deadly Sins café on Victoria Street, Sedonia homewares store on Gamon Street, Charles & Gamon restaurant and bar on the corner of Charles Street and Gamon Street (named after its prominent position on two of the major streets in the village) and the Est 1906 café on Charles Street (named thus because the suburb of Seddon was officially established in the year 1906).

Sport and Activities

The Seddon Cricket Club has its home ground in the Yarraville Gardens.

Seddon also shares its Australian Rules football team, Yarraville-Seddon, with neighbouring Yarraville. The team competes in the Western Region Football League.

Opposite Seddon Station is the 5th Footscray Scout Group. With programs for children aged 6 to 15, the group is part of Scouts Australia, and meets in a historic hall built in the 1930s.

Seddon is home to clubs for well-being, including My Mama Said and Westside Yoga, formally known as the Australian Yoga Academy Seddon.

Cookery courses are held at Miss Biscuit, and the Spice Bazaar Cooking School.

Local Landmarks

Residential Architecture
Residential Seddon consists predominantly of single storey Victorian 'workers cottages' and Edwardian terrace houses, with some larger double storey early 20th century buildings in the village.

Public Spaces
Seddon features many small gardens, parks and playgrounds scattered throughout the suburb. Harris Reserve is on the corner of Gamon Street and Thomson Street. Bristow Reserve is a favorite among toddlers and barbecue masters alike and is located on the corner of Pilgrim Street and John Street. Mappin Reserve, the largest green space, can be found between Bell Street and Nicholson Street.

Public Transportation 

Seddon's railway station is on the Werribee and Williamstown railway lines of the Melbourne train network. Seddon Village is most closely serviced by the Middle Footscray station on the Sunbury line, as well as the 223 and 472 bus routes.

National Broadband Network
Most of Seddon is connected to the National Broadband Network (NBN) via fibre optic cabling, replacing the aging copper network and providing relief for the Footscray copper exchange.

See also
 City of Footscray – Seddon was previously within this former local government area.
 City of Maribyrnong – Seddon is located within this local government area.

References

Suburbs of Melbourne
Suburbs of the City of Maribyrnong